Roughan may refer to:

Roughan, a townland in Dungannon and South Tyrone Borough Council, County Tyrone, Northern Ireland
Roughan Castle, a castle in Roughan

People with the surname
Howard Roughan, American writer

See also
Roughan Hall, a historic building in Boston, Massachusetts, United States